Joseph D. Clemmons, Sr. (born 1929) is a former three term Democratic member of the Connecticut House of Representatives from Norwalk, Connecticut's 140th assembly district from 1997 to 2003. He also served on the Norwalk Common Council beginning in 1995.

Early life and family 
He is the son of Frank Clemmons, founder of the First Church of God In Christ in Brooklyn, New York. He attended Long Island University  and Howard University. He earned a Master of Divinity degree from Yale Divinity School and a Doctor of Ministry degree from Colgate Rochester Divinity School. Clemmons was ordained by Bishop O.M. Kelly in 1952.  In 1975, he was a Martin Luther King fellow, and in that capacity, he traveled to West Africa, Nigeria and Ghana. He was an Elementary School Teacher in Baltimore and a Middle and High School Teacher in Bridgeport and Norwalk. In 1979, he retired as a certified teacher of Spanish to devote full-time to the ministry. He is a former president of the Hampton University Ministers' Conference, in Hampton, Virginia and he continues to serve on its executive board. He was inducted into the Morehouse College of Preachers in 1988. Clemmons is the founder of Miracle Temple Church of God in Christ in Norwalk.

Political career 
Clemmons was elected to the Norwalk Common Council in 1995. He was elected to the Connecticut House of Representatives in a special election in February 1997 and was re-elected in November 1998  defeating Republican Jon J. Velez and also re-elected in November 2000.

Other offices 
 Norwalk Fire Department chaplain
 Member, board of directors of Norwalk Economic Opportunity Now (NEON)
 Founder of Pivot Ministries, a Christ-centered drug program
 Executive director and board member of Norwalk Area Ministry
 Elected as an associate justice of the nine-member judiciary board of the Church of God in Christ World-wide. He was elected to a seven-year term in 2004.

References

External links 
 Joseph Clemmons - Project Vote Smart

African-American Christian clergy
American Christian clergy
Connecticut city council members
African-American state legislators in Connecticut
Living people
Democratic Party members of the Connecticut House of Representatives
Politicians from Norwalk, Connecticut
1929 births
Yale Divinity School alumni
Long Island University alumni
People from Brooklyn
Colgate Rochester Crozer Divinity School alumni
21st-century African-American people
20th-century African-American people